Silicone Impregnated Refractory Ceramic Ablator, or SIRCA, is a lightweight ceramic ablative material, often used in thermal protection systems to protect parts of launch vehicles and spacecraft from very high temperature heat sources.

SIRCA was used for ceramic substrates on both the Viking spacecraft and the Space Shuttle, and was also used on the aeroshells for Mars Pathfinder and the Mars Exploration Rovers.  It was developed at NASA Ames Research Center in the 1980s and 1990s.

Description 

and is easily machined to custom shapes.

References 

Spaceflight technology